The coefficient of relationship is a measure of the degree of consanguinity (or biological relationship) between two individuals. The term coefficient of relationship was defined by Sewall Wright in 1922, and was derived from his definition of the coefficient of inbreeding of 1921. The measure is most commonly used in genetics and genealogy.  A coefficient of inbreeding can be calculated for an individual, and is typically one-half the coefficient of relationship between the parents.

In general, the higher the level of inbreeding the closer the coefficient of relationship between the parents approaches a value of 1, expressed as a percentage, and approaches a value of 0 for individuals with arbitrarily remote common ancestors.

Coefficient of relationship

The coefficient of relationship between two individuals B and C is obtained by a summation of coefficients calculated for every line by which they are connected to their common ancestors. Each such line connects the two individuals via a common ancestor, passing through no individual which is not a common ancestor more than once. A path coefficient between an ancestor A and an offspring O separated by  generations is given as:

The coefficient of relationship is now obtained by summing over all path coefficients:

By assuming that the pedigree can be traced back to a sufficiently remote population of perfectly random-bred stock (fA = 0 for all A in the sum) the definition of r may be simplified to 

where p enumerates all paths connecting B and C with unique common ancestors (i.e. all paths terminate at a common ancestor and may not pass through a common ancestor to a common ancestor's ancestor), and L(p) is the length of the path p.

To give an (artificial) example: 
Assuming that two individuals share the same 32 ancestors of n = 5 generations ago, but do not have any common ancestors at four or fewer generations ago, their coefficient of relationship would be 
, which for n = 5, is, or approximately 0.0313 or 3%.

Individuals for which the same situation applies for their 1024 ancestors of ten generations ago would have a coefficient of r =  2−10 = 0.1%.
If follows that the value of r can be given to an accuracy of a few percent if the family tree of both individuals is known for a depth of five generations, and to an accuracy of a tenth of a percent if the known depth is at least ten generations. The contribution to r from common ancestors of 20 generations ago (corresponding to roughly 500 years in human genealogy, or the contribution from common descent from a medieval population) falls below one part-per-million.

Human relationships

The coefficient of relationship is sometimes used to express degrees of kinship in numeric terms in human genealogy.

In human relationships, the value of the coefficient of relationship is usually calculated based on the knowledge of a full family tree extending to a comparatively small number of generations, perhaps of the order of three or four. As explained above, the value for the coefficient of relationship so calculated is thus a lower bound, with an actual value that may be up to a few percent higher. The value is accurate to within 1% if the full family tree of both individuals is known to a depth of seven generations.

Most incest laws concern the relationships where r = 25% or higher, although many ignore the rare case of double first cousins. Some jurisdictions also prohibit sexual relations or marriage between cousins of various degree, or individuals related only through adoption or affinity. Whether there is any likelihood of conception is generally considered irrelevant.

Kinship coefficient

The kinship coefficient is a simple measure of relatedness, defined as the probability that a pair of randomly sampled homologous alleles are identical by descent. More simply, it is the probability that an allele selected randomly from an individual, i, and an allele selected at the same autosomal locus from another individual, j, are identical and from the same ancestor.

The coefficient of relatedness is equal to twice the kinship coefficient.

Calculation
The kinship coefficient between two individuals, i and j, is represented as Φij. The kinship coefficient between a non-inbred individual and itself, Φii, is equal to 1/2. This is due to the fact that humans are diploid, meaning the only way for the randomly chosen alleles to be identical by descent is if the same allele is chosen twice (probability 1/2). Similarly, the relationship between a parent and a child is found by the chance that the randomly picked allele in the child is from the parent (probability 1/2) and the probability of the allele that is picked from the parent being the same one passed to the child (probability 1/2). Since these two events are independent of each other, they are multiplied Φij = 1/2 X 1/2 = 1/4.

See also

Accidental incest
Effective population size
F-statistics
Genetic distance
Genetic diversity
Genetic sexual attraction
Inbreeding
Inbreeding avoidance
Inbreeding depression
Incest
Incest taboo
Legality of incest
Malecot's method of coancestry
Pedigree collapse
Phylogenetics
Prohibited degree of kinship
Proximity of blood

Notes

References

Bibliography
 five papers:
 I) The biometric relations between offspring and parent
 II) The effects of inbreeding on the genetic composition of a population
 III) Assortative mating based on somatic resemblance
 IV) The effects of selection
 V) General considerations
 
 Malécot, G. (1948) Les mathématiques de l'hérédité, Masson et Cie, Paris. 
 Lange, K. (1997) Mathematical and statistical methods for genetic analysis, Springer-Verlag, New-York.
 

Genealogy
Kinship and descent
Breeding
Dog breeding
Incest
Population genetics